Ardley Cove is a cove that lies north of Ardley Island in Maxwell Bay, King George Island. It was named Caleta Ardley by an Argentine expedition (about 1957) in association with Ardley Island.

References

 

Coves of Antarctica